Padde Huli is a 2019 Indian Kannada language action drama film written by K. Manju and directed by Guru Deshpande. Produced by M. Ramesh Reddy, film's music is scored by  B. Ajaneesh Loknath. Shreyas Manju and Nishvika Naidu feature in lead roles along with V. Ravichandran, Sudharani and playing the supporting characters while Rakshit Shetty and Puneeth Rajkumar appears in a guest role. K. S. Chandrashekar is the cinematographer of the film under the banner of Tejaswini Enterprises. This movie is remake of the 2017 Tamil film Meesaya Murukku.

Cast 
 Shreyas Manju as Sampath 
 Nishvika Naidu as Sangeetha
 V. Ravichandran as Sampath's father
 Sudharani as of Sampath's mother
 Chikkanna
 Vinayak Joshi
 Dharamanna Kadur
 Amith Vishwanath
 Madhusudhan Rao as               Maarikambaa, Sangeetha's uncle
Sundar Ram 
Swathi Gurudatt 
Bhaskar Surya
 Rakshit Shetty as Karna (Cameo appearance)
 Puneeth Rajkumar as himself (Cameo appearance)
 Sundar as Sangeetha's father

Soundtrack 

The soundtrack is composed by B. Ajaneesh Loknath.

References

External links 
 

2019 films
2010s Kannada-language films
2010s musical drama films
Kannada remakes of Tamil films
2019 drama films
Films directed by Guru Deshpande